The name Bank of the Commonwealth represents any of the following:

 Bank of the Commonwealth (Kentucky), a historic site in Shepherdsville, Kentucky
 Bank of the Commonwealth (Michigan), a former financial institution headquartered in Detroit, Michigan; acquired by Comerica in 1983